John Anthony Potsklan Jr. (September 24, 1920 – June 22, 1990) was an American football player and coach of football and basketball. He served as the head football coach at Albright College in Reading, Pennsylvania from 1955 to 1948, compiling a record of 144–122–5. Potsklan also had three stints also the head men's basketball coach at Albright, in 1966–67, from 1968 to 1974, and 1980 to 1985, tallying a mark of 79–113.

Early years, military service, and playing career
Potsklan was born in 1920 in Hiller, Pennsylvania. He attended Brownsville High School in Fayette County, Pennsylvania, where he played three sports. He then played college football as an end for the Penn State Nittany Lions in 1941, 1946, and 1947.

Potsklan's college career was interrupted by military service with a bomber squadron in the United States Army Air Corps during World War II. He was shot down over Germany and was held in a German prisoner of war camp.

Potsklan also served for a time with the Pittsburgh Steelers of the National Football League.

Coaching career
Potsklan was an assistant coach at Albright College in Reading, Pennsylvania in 1953 and 1954. He took over as head coach in 1955. He remained as head coach for 30 years. He led the 1960 Albright team to a perfect 9–0 record and followed that with a 7–0–1 record in 1961. He led Albright's football team to seven Middle Atlantic Conference (MAC) North Division championships (1959, 1960, 1968, 1972, 1975, 1976, and 1977) and was named MAC coach of the year six times. He retired at the end of the 1984 season with a 144–122–5 record. He also coached the Albright basketball team.

Later years
Potsklan died in 1990 in Reading, Pennsylvania at age 69.

Head coaching record

Football

References

1920 births
1990 deaths
American football ends
Albright Lions football coaches
Albright Lions men's basketball coaches
Penn State Nittany Lions football players
American prisoners of war in World War II
United States Army personnel of World War II
World War II prisoners of war held by Germany
People from Fayette County, Pennsylvania
Coaches of American football from Pennsylvania
Players of American football from Pennsylvania
Basketball players from Pennsylvania
Military personnel from Pennsylvania